Saxifraga hypnoides, called mossy saxifrage, cut-leaved saxifrage, Dovedale moss, Eve's cushion, Indian moss, lady's cushion, and queen's cushion, is a species of flowering plant in the family Saxifragaceae. It is native to northwestern Europe; Iceland, the Faroe Islands, Norway, Ireland, Great Britain, Belgium, and France, and has been introduced to Czechia, the Eastern Himalayas, and Tibet. In the north of its range a tetraploid form predominates, and in the south a diploid form is more likely to be found.

References

hypnoides
Flora of Belgium
Flora of France
Flora of the Faroe Islands
Flora of Great Britain
Flora of Iceland
Flora of Ireland
Flora of Norway
Plants described in 1753 
Taxa named by Carl Linnaeus